Volodymyr Piddubnyy , (Ukrainian:Володимир Піддубний), is a Paralympian athlete from Ukraine competing mainly in category F11 shot put and discus throw events.

Volodymyr first competed in the 2000 Summer Paralympics in both the shot put and discus throw without winning any medals.  In 2004 he concentrated in the shot put and won a bronze medal.  He switched for the 2008 Summer Paralympics but was unable to win a medal in the discus.

References

Paralympic athletes of Ukraine
Athletes (track and field) at the 2000 Summer Paralympics
Athletes (track and field) at the 2004 Summer Paralympics
Athletes (track and field) at the 2008 Summer Paralympics
Paralympic bronze medalists for Ukraine
Living people
Medalists at the 2004 Summer Paralympics
Year of birth missing (living people)
Paralympic medalists in athletics (track and field)
Ukrainian male discus throwers
Ukrainian male shot putters
Visually impaired discus throwers
Visually impaired shot putters
Paralympic discus throwers
Paralympic shot putters